Battle of Husaybah may refer to one of the following:

Iraq War
 Battle of Husaybah (2004) – sometimes referred to as the "First Battle of Husaybah"
 Operation Steel Curtain – sometimes referred to as the "Second Battle of Husaybah"